An ukay-ukay, or wagwagan in some areas, is a Philippine store where secondhand items such as clothes, bags, shoes and other accessories are sold at a cheap price. Items sold at the ukay-ukay are commonly imported from North American or European countries.

Etymology

The term ukay-ukay is derived from the Cebuano verb ukay, which means "to dig" or "to sift through" respectively. Technically, the english term of Ukay-Ukay is "DIG-DIG". It is synonymous with the verb wagwag, an act of dusting off a piece of clothing by taking hold of one end and snapping it in the air, and shaking the item to dust it off; and SM, meaning segunda mano (secondhand), which is also a pun on the foremost Philippine retail chain SM.

History
The first ukay-ukay was believed to have been founded in the early 1980s in Baguio. When calamities frequented the Philippines during that year, the Philippine Salvation Army would send secondhand garments and other goods to the refugees and victims as humanitarian assistance to the victims of the calamities. Soon enough, the shipped goods, upon piling up, were bought in bulk by traders and sold to the public at significantly low prices. They used to market it to the low-income bracket, but following ukay-ukay's increase in popularity, relatively richer customers who seek low-priced branded goods patronize ukay-ukay stores.

Legality
The commercial importation of secondhand clothing to the Philippines has been prohibited since 1966 under the Republic Act No. 4653, also known as the "Act to safeguard the health of the Filipino people and maintain the dignity of the nation through the prohibition of the importation of used clothing and rags". It renders a significant part of the ukay-ukay business illegal.  There have been many calls to review and amend the law legalizing the sale of imported used clothing by ukay-ukay stores.

See also
Divisoria
Sari-sari store

References

Bibliography

External links

The University of Ukay at Rappler

Philippine culture
Retailing in the Philippines